The Bowling Green Falcons men's soccer team is the National Collegiate Athletic Association NCAA Division I intercollegiate college soccer team of Bowling Green State University located in Bowling Green, Ohio. The team played in BGSU's full-time home of the Mid-American Conference through the 2022 season, after which the MAC dropped that sport. Bowling Green will join the Missouri Valley Conference as a single-sport member effective in 2023.

History 
Source:(The 2017 Record Book [PDF]  is on the "Additional Links" tab) @ 

Bowling Green State University first fielded a men's soccer team in 1965. The team initially competed as an independent.

From 1986 through 1992, the Falcons were a member of the Mid-America Soccer Conference, winning the season championship in 1987, 1989, 199, and 1992 and the conference's only tournament championship in 1991.

From 1993 through 2022, BGSU competed as a member of the Mid-American Conference. They won the regular season title in 1986, 2000, 2002, and 2020. The Falcons won the first three MAC Tournament championships in 1985–87, and have advanced to the title game more than five times since then.

Colors and badge 

The BGSU school colors are  burnt orange and seal brown.  In 1914, Professor Leon Winslow of the industrial arts department reportedly saw the color combination on a woman's hat while riding the interurban trolley to Toledo and recommended to the board of trustees that those colors be adopted.

Stadium 
The Falcons play at Mickey Cochrane Field (Cochrane Soccer Stadium) on the BGSU campus. The stadium seats 700 with portable seating for 800 more available and standing room for hundreds more.

Rivalries 
Bowling Green's main college soccer rival is Wright State. The two compete for the I-75 Cup.

Honors 
Source: 

More than 30 BGSU Falcons have gone on to play professional soccer

Bowling Green men's soccer's first head coach, Mickey Cochrane, was inducted into the NSCAA (National Soccer Coaches Association of America, now known as United Soccer Coaches) Hall of Fame in 1995.

All-Americans

 Dave Dyminski – 1972 NSCAA Honorable Mention, 1973 NSCAA 2nd Team
 Bud Lewis – 1974 NSCAA Honorable Mention
 Dennis Mepham – 1979 NSCAA Honorable Mention
 Neil Ridgway – 1982 NSCAA 1st Team, 1983 NSCAA 1st Team
 Jon Felton –  1987 NSCAA 3rd Team
 Rob Martella – 1992 NSCAA 1st Team
 Steve Klein – 1996 NSCAA 1st Team
 Scott Vallow – 1997 NSCAA 3rd Team, 1998 NSCAA 3rd Team
 Chris Doré – 1999 NSCAA 3rd Team

Academic All-Americans

 Kyle Royer – 1988 ISAA adidas Scholar-Athlete All-American. 1989 ISAA adidas Scholar-Athlete All-American, 1990 ISAA adidas Scholar-Athlete All-American
 Greg Murphy – 1991 ISAA adidas Scholar-Athlete All-American. 1991 CoSIDA Academic All-American
 Joe Burch – 1995 CoSIDA Academic All-American, 1995 NSCAA Scholar-Athlete All-American Honorable Mention, 1996 CoSIDA 1st Team Academic All-American
 Ty Fowler – 1999 CoSIDA 1st Team Academic All-American
 Jacob Lawrence – 2009 ESPN The Magazine Academic All-America First Team
 Brandon Silva – 2013 CoSIDA 2nd Team Academic All-American
 Pat Flynn – 2014 CoSIDA 2nd Team Academic All-American, 2015  CoSIDA 1st Team Academic All-American, 2016  CoSIDA 1st Team Academic All-American
 Joe Sullivan – 2015  CoSIDA 2nd Team Academic All-American, 2016  CoSIDA 1st Team Academic All-American

Notable alumni 

 Omari Aldridge
 Thaddeus Atalig
 George Davis IV
 Fred DeGand
 Cameron Hepple
 Steve Klein
 Dennis Mepham
 Scott Vallow
 Dana Veth
 Kyle Williams
Bud Lewis

References

External links 
 

 
1965 establishments in Ohio
Association football clubs established in 1965